Neutrodiaptomus is a genus of copepods in the family Diaptomidae. The Japanese endemic species N. formosus is listed as Data Deficient on the IUCN Red List. The genus Neutrodiaptomus contains the following species:

Neutrodiaptomus alatus Hu, 1943
Neutrodiaptomus amurensis (Rylov, 1918)
Neutrodiaptomus formosus (K. Kikuchi, 1928)
Neutrodiaptomus genogibbosus Shen, 1956
Neutrodiaptomus incongruens (Poppe, 1888)
Neutrodiaptomus lianshanensis Sung et al., 1975
Neutrodiaptomus liaochengensis Chen et al., 1992
Neutrodiaptomus lobatus (Lilljeborg, 1889)
Neutrodiaptomus mariadvigae (Brehm, 1921)
Neutrodiaptomus minutus (Lilljeborg in Guerne & Richard, 1889)
Neutrodiaptomus nanaicus Borutsky, 1961
Neutrodiaptomus okadai (Horasawa, 1934)
Neutrodiaptomus ostroumovi (Stepanova, 1981)
Neutrodiaptomus pachypoditus (Rylov, 1925)
Neutrodiaptomus sklyarovae Markevich, 1985
Neutrodiaptomus tumidus Kiefer, 1937
Neutrodiaptomus tungkwanensis Shen & Song, 1962

References

Diaptomidae
Taxonomy articles created by Polbot